Kwon Young-se (Korean: 권영세; Hanja: 權寧世; born 24 February 1959) is a South Korean politician and diplomat who is currently serving as the member for Yongsan in the National Assembly. A member of the People Power Party, he is often described as a moderate conservative within his party. He previously served in the National Assembly as the member for Yeongdeungpo B from 2002 to 2012.

Early life 
Kwon Yeong-se was born on February 24, 1959, into a working-class family in Seoul. He graduated from the Seoul National University School of Law and passed his bar examination in 1983. He later received his MPA from the Harvard Kennedy School.

Career 
Prior to becoming a politician, Kwon worked as a public prosecutor. He entered politics when he was nominated as the Grand National Party's candidate for Yeongdeungpo B in the 2002 South Korean by-elections after former member Kim Min-seok's resignation in order to run in the Seoul Mayoral election. Kwon was elected with 54.9% of the vote in the election. He was re-elected in his constituency in the 2004 election and the 2008 election, but failed to be re-elected in the 2012 election.

While not a member of the National Assembly, he actively supported Park Geun-hye's campaign in the 2012 South Korean presidential election. He was then appointed by President Park Geun-hye to serve as South Korea's Ambassador to China in early 2013. He returned to South Korea in March 2015 and was succeeded by Kim Jang-soo.

Upon his return to South Korea, he once again ran as the Saenuri Party's candidate for the Yeongdeungpo B constituency in the 2016 South Korean legislative election, however he was defeated by incumbent Shin Kyoung-min. 

In the 2020 South Korean legislative election, Kwon narrowly defeated Democratic candidate Kang Tae-woong in the Yongsan constituency race, returning to the National Assembly as a member after eight years.

References 

1959 births
Living people
People from Seoul
Seoul National University School of Law alumni
Harvard Kennedy School alumni
South Korean prosecutors
21st-century South Korean lawyers
Members of the National Assembly (South Korea)
People Power Party (South Korea) politicians
Ambassadors of South Korea to China
Government ministers of South Korea